Norm Clarke is an American gossip columnist in Las Vegas, Nevada. He wrote the column "Vegas Confidential" for the Las Vegas Review-Journal from 1999 to 2016. He publishes the website Norm Clarke's Vegas Diary.

Career
Clarke began in the newspaper business by covering sports for the Montana newspaper Terry Tribune. He moved on to newspaper jobs in Miles City, Helena and Billings, Montana. In 1973 he went to work for the Associated Press in Cincinnati, Ohio. While there, he covered the Beverly Hills Supper Club fire in neighboring Southgate, Kentucky, where 165 people perished. His work in covering the collapse of a 1978 nuclear power plant cooling tower in West Virginia, in which 66 construction workers died, earned Clarke and his colleagues a Pulitzer Prize nomination. He later transferred to San Diego, California and then Los Angeles, where he coordinated AP's coverage of the 1984 Summer Olympics.

Clarke next went to the Denver Rocky Mountain News to work as a sports writer, eventually covering the Major League Baseball team the Colorado Rockies . In 1996, he switched to writing a "man about town" column that would become the prototype for his Las Vegas column. In 1999, Clarke joined the Las Vegas Review-Journal as the man-about-town columnist.

Clarke has written four books:

 Tracing Terry Trails, a collection of historical happenings in Prairie County, Montana. Published in 1982 for the Terry, Montana centennial celebration.
High Hard Ones: Denver’s Road to the Rockies, from Inside the Newspaper War, is available as an e-book at Norm.Vegas.
Vegas Confidential: Norm Clarke! Sin City's Ace Insider 1,000 Naked Truths, published by Stephens Press. The book is a compilation of material from old columns, plus a great deal of new material. In the book, Clarke lists (among other things) the ten worst tippers in Las Vegas.
Norm Clarke's Vegas Confidential: Sinsational Celebrity Tales, also published by Stephens Press. In the book, Clarke offers remembrances of celebrities who live in, or visit Las Vegas

He publishes the website Norm Clarke's Vegas Diary, which covers Las Vegas news, celebrity sightings, history, and human-interest stories.

References

External links 

Norm Clarke's Vegas Diary
What happens in Vegas, Norm Clarke knows. Columbia Journalism Review March 19, 2017
Norm Clarke’s career was ‘an ongoing love letter’ to Las Vegas Rachel Crosby Las Vegas Review-Journal July 27, 2016 
Clarke's keynote address to Society of Professional Journalists (University of Florida website, QuickTime)

1942 births
Living people
American columnists
American newspaper reporters and correspondents
People from the Las Vegas Valley
People from Prairie County, Montana
Writers from Montana
Writers from Nevada
Associated Press reporters
Rocky Mountain News people
Journalists from Montana